National Route 258 is a national highway of Japan connecting Ōgaki, Gifu and Kuwana, Mie on the island of Honshu, Japan, with a total length of . The highway was completed on April 1, 1963. It is also known as the Mino Kaidō.

See also

References

National highways in Japan
Roads in Gifu Prefecture
Roads in Mie Prefecture